The 1994–95 Serie A season was the 61st season of the Serie A, the top level of ice hockey in Italy. 10 teams participated in the league, and HC Bozen won the championship by defeating AS Varese Hockey in the final.

Regular season

Playoffs

Relegation 
 HC Fassa - Asiago Hockey 2:1 (9:4, 4:5, 9:5)

External links
 Season on hockeyarchives.info

1994–95 in Italian ice hockey
Serie A (ice hockey) seasons
Italy